John I, Lord of Egmond (before 1310 – 28 December 1369) was Lord of Egmond, Lord of IJsselstein, bailiff of Kennemerland (1353-1354) and stadtholder of Holland.

Life 
He was a son of Walter II and his wife, Beatrix of Doortogne.  He is first mentioned in 1328, when he fights in the Battle of Cassel and accompanies Count William III of Holland to Flanders, to assist the Count of Flanders suppressing a rebellion in Bruges and the surrounding area.

In 1343, he is a member of a group of bailiffs who administer Holland while the Count is travelling.  In 1344, he is enfeoffed with Nieuwendoorn castle.  He participated in the third crusade of Count William IV to Prussia and in the Siege of Utrecht in 1345, but not in the disastrous Battle of Warns later that year.

In subsequent years, he played an important role in the politics of Holland.  In 1350, he was one of the signatories of the Cod Alliance Treaty that set off the Hook and Cod wars.  He fought in the Battle of Naarden in 1350 and in the Battle of Zwartewaal in 1351.  He was then sent to England to mediate in the dispute between Countess Margaret and her son, Count William V, however, he was unsuccessful.

After he returned to Holland, he began a campaign against the citizens of Bunschoten in 1355.  In the winter of 1356, he besieged the castle of Nyevelt, on the orders of the count, and took it after a seven-week siege.  In 1356, William V appointed him governor of the area above the Meuse, jointly with his brother Gerry.  In 1358, William V was declared insane by his brother Albert.  John I was a member of the regency council.  In 1359, he is one of the Cod leaders to sign a reconciliation with the city of Delft.

In 1363, his father-in-law, Lord Arnold of IJsselstein died and John I inherited the Lordship of IJsselstein.

He died in 1369 and was buried in the church of IJsselstein.

Marriage and issue 
He married Guida of IJsselstein and had the following children:
 Arnold (– 1409), his successor
 Gerry
 Albert, a canon in Utrecht
 Beatrix, married Ghisbert of Vianen
 Bearte
 Maria (d. ), married Philip IV of Wassenaer
 Catherine, married Bartholomew of Raephorst
 Antonia, abbess in 's-Hertogenbosch
 Elisabeth
 Greta

References 
 Johannes a Leydis: , written between 1477 and 1484
 Willem Procurator, Kroniek, translated by M. Gumbert-Hepp and J.P. Gumbert (ed.), Uitgeverij Verloren, Hilversum, 2001

Footnotes 

1300s births
1369 deaths
John 1
Lords of IJsselstein
Year of birth unknown
People from Egmond
14th-century people of the Holy Roman Empire